Apley is a hamlet and civil parish in the West Lindsey district of Lincolnshire, England.

Apley church, dedicated to St Andrew, is a small brick building erected in 1871 at a cost of £284. It was built to conduct burial services within the graveyard of the former and by then non-existing medieval Church of St Andrew's, which before 1816 had decayed and been reduced to its foundations. In the 19th century the churchyard also served the parish of Stainfield. Apley professions and trades listed in 1872 included a parish clerk, a boot & shoemaker, six farmers, two of whom were at Kingthorpe, and two carriers, one of whom was a shopkeeper.

Apley Beck marks the course of a 12th-century monastic canal linking Bullington Priory to Barlings eau.

References

External links 
 
 

Hamlets in Lincolnshire
Civil parishes in Lincolnshire
West Lindsey District